National Institute of Technology Puducherry (NIT Puducherry or NITPY) is an autonomous public technical and research university located in the city of Karaikal in Union Territory of Puducherry and is a coastal enclave in the basin of river Kaveri within the Nagapattinam District of Tamil Nadu. Founded and Established in 2010, it is one among the 31 National institutes of Technology of India and is declared as an Institute of National Importance by the Government of India under National Institutes of Technology, Science Education and Research Act, 2007.

History
NIT Puducherry is one of the ten NITs, sanctioned by the Government of India in 2009, as part of the Eleventh Five-Year Plan (2007–2012). The institute was mentored by National Institute of Technology, Tiruchirappalli in the initial years.

Campus
NIT Puducherry is having a campus spread around 258 acres in the suburban village Poovam and Thiruvettakudy of city of Karaikal in the Union territory of Puducherry. NIT Puducherry is a fully residential campus. The institute and hostels are equipped with Internet and LAN facility. The campus consists of boys hostel, girls hostel, science block, administrative block, guest house, director residence, staff residence. The institute also has Sports complex with Football ground, Basketball ground, Cricket ground and Badminton Court.

Organisation and administration

Governance 
The President of India is the ex officio visitor of all the National Institutes of Technology (NITs). The National Institutes of Technology Council (NIT Council) works directly under him and it includes the minister-in-charge of technical education in Central Government, the Chairman and the Directors of all the NITs, the Chairman of University Grants Commission (India), the Director-General of Council of Scientific and Industrial Research, the Directors of other selected central institutions of repute, members of Parliament, Joint Council Secretary of Ministry of Human Resource Development, nominees of the Central Government, All India Council for Technical Education and the Visitor. The NIT Council is the highest decision making body in the NIT fraternity and is answerable only to the Government of India. The NIT Council is expected to meet regularly and take steps conducive for maximum growth of the NITs as whole in the near future.

Below the NIT Council is each NIT's Board of Governors. Each institute has a Board of Governors responsible for its administration and control. The Board of Governors of each NIT consists of the chairman and other members, which include government, industry, alumni, deans and associate deans, registrar, head of departments and faculty representation. The Director is the chairperson of the Senate and serves under the Board of Governors and is the Institute's chief academic and executive officer. The Registrar is the chief administrative officer and overviews day-to-day operations. Below the Head of Department, are the various faculty members (professors, assistant professors, and lecturers).

Academic policies are decided by the Senate, which is composed of some professors and other representatives. The Senate controls and approves the curriculum, courses, examinations, and results. Senate committees examine specific academic matters. The teaching, training, and research activities of various departments of the institute are periodically reviewed to maintain educational standards.

The NITs across India and are fully funded institutions under the Central Government with Deemed to be University status. The move was intended to make the institutions centers of excellence and being developed as autonomous and flexible academic institutions of excellence to meet the sweeping changes taking place in the industrial environment in post liberalized India and also the rapidly changing scene of technical education globally.

Departments

Engineering, Sciences and Humanities 

Chemistry
Civil Engineering
Computer Science and Engineering
Electrical and Electronics Engineering
Electronics and Communication Engineering
Humanities and Social Sciences
Mathematics
Mechanical Engineering
 Physics

Academics

Admission
Admission to the Undergraduate programs (BTech) is highly competitive and is based on the rank secured by the candidates in the Joint Entrance Examination (Main) conducted by National Testing Agency (NTA). Candidates must also secure at least 75% marks in the 12th class examination, or be in the top 20 percentile in the 12th class examination conducted by the respective Central/State Boards. For Scheduled Castes/Scheduled Tribes students, the qualifying marks would be 65% in the 12th class examination. The examination is considered to be one of the toughest examinations in the world.

In total number of seats available 50% of seats are reserved for the candidates having residence/native (home state) at Puducherry (includes Puducherry, Karaikal, Mahe, Yanam) and Andaman and Nicobar Islands. The remaining 50% seats are filled on All India quota basis. Joint Seat Allocation Authority(JoSSA) handles UG admission process.

Admission to Postgraduate programs (MTech) is done based on the rank secured by the candidate in Graduate Aptitude Test in Engineering (GATE) conducted jointly by the Indian Institute of Science and seven Indian Institutes of Technologies at Roorkee, Delhi, Guwahati, Kanpur, Kharagpur, Chennai (Madras) and Mumbai (Bombay) on behalf of the National Coordination Board – GATE, Department of Higher Education, Ministry of Education (MoE), Government of India. PG admission is made through the Centralized Counselling for MTech (CCMT).

NIT Puducherry follows the reservation policy declared by the Supreme Court of India, by which 27% of seats are reserved for Other Backward Classes (OBCs), 15% for Scheduled Castes (SCs), and 7.5% for Scheduled Tribes (STs) and 10% for economically weaker section (ews) .

The institute also accepts foreign nationals through scholarships awarded by the Government of India, and Non-Resident Indians (NRIs/PIOs) through an independent scheme known as Direct Admission for Students Abroad (DASA).

Courses

Undergraduate programs

BTech 
The institute awards 4 years long BTech degree courses in the following disciplines
Computer Science and Engineering
Electronics and Communication Engineering
Electrical and Electronics Engineering
Mechanical Engineering
Civil Engineering

Post-Graduate Programs

MTech 
The institute offers 2 years long MTech degree course in the following disciplines

Computer Science and Engineering
Communication Systems
Power Electronics
Design Engineering

PhD
The institute accepts doctoral candidates for research in the following fields

 Chemistry
 Civil Engineering
 Computer Science and Engineering
 Electrical and Electronics Engineering
 Electronics and Communication Engineering
 English
 Mathematics
 Mechanical Engineering
 Physics

Rankings

NIT Puducherry ranked 130 & 136 among engineering colleges by the National Institutional Ranking Framework (NIRF) in 2020 & 2022 Respectively.

See also
Puducherry Technological University 
National Institutes of Technology
Indian Institutes of Technology
List of Institutes of National Importance
Joint Entrance Examination (Main)
All India Engineering Entrance Examination
Graduate Aptitude Test in Engineering

References

External links

 

2010 establishments in Puducherry
National Institutes of Technology
Educational institutions established in 2010
Engineering colleges in Puducherry
Karaikal